Aldea del Rey is a municipality in the province of Ciudad Real, Castile-La Mancha, Spain. It has a (decreasing) population of 1.721 (1-1-20.16).

Main sights
Castle of Calatrava la Nueva
Renaissance Palacio de Clavería (15th century), founded by King Philip of Spain for the knights of the Order of Calatrava.

References

External links

Municipalities in the Province of Ciudad Real